The Silver Jubilee of Jigme Singye Wangchuck was a celebration of 25 years of his reign. Jigme Singye Wangchuck was the 4th King of Bhutan (Druk Gyalpo) until he was succeeded by his son, Jigme Khesar Namgyel Wangchuck on 9 December 2006.

  Commemorative Silver Jubilee Medal of King Jigme Singye Wangchuck (02/06/1999).

References

Wangchuck dynasty
Orders, decorations, and medals of Bhutan
1999 in Bhutan
Awards established in 1999
Silver jubilees
Historical events in Bhutan